Path of Titans is a prehistoric expansive MMO Survival game being developed and published by the Australian studio Alderon Games, where players take on the role of a dinosaur.

Gameplay 
The player controls multiple varieties of different dinosaurs species and other prehistoric animals from a third person perspective, exploring a prehistoric forest and completing quests to earn experience points. Players can initially choose from 30 available dinosaurs to play, such as the Alioramus, Styracosaurus, and Stegosaurus. Each of these dinosaur species uses a different playstyle in order to complete objectives and survive in their respective environments in S.A.S.

The "growth mechanic" is the primary way to progress in the game. As the player gains experience points, the dinosaur grows linearly and continually, rather than step-wise, to its full adult size. The player gains progress on growth by completing simple quests or by turning in trophies that are acquired from mature dinosaurs.

Parties can be formed between players. Each party has 10 slots, however certain dinosaurs can take up multiple party slots depending on their physical size. Very small dinosaurs may only take up 1 party slot, allowing you to fit up to 10 members in your party, while the largest of dinosaurs can take up to 5 slots, which will only allow 2 members of the same size dinosaur in a single party. While in parties, players will receive party quests centered around the area of the party leader.

Path of Titans offers a full player-versus-player experience. The full player-versus-player system offered within Path of Titans allows any dinosaur player to attack any other dinosaur regardless of relative growth maturity. The incentive for player-versus-player fighting is for control of area resources, to gain trophies, or to gain food; carnivore dinosaurs can consume the dinosaurs that they've successfully killed or hunted.

There are no humans in the world of Path of Titans. Players may only control dinosaurs and may pick between sixteen carnivores or fourteen herbivores, and there are no AI controlled humans. All dinosaurs in a realm are player controlled, while small fauna and fish are AI controlled and act as a food source.

There are currently two maps to play on - Panjura and Gondwa. Panjura is a mountainous region with forests, rivers, fields, and lakes. Gondwa is an island map with an emphasis on open water and air, being the only map with access to fully aquatic reptiles and flyers.

List of available playable dinosaurs 
The newly-released game currently features 16 carnivorous animals, 14 herbivores, and 5 unplayable prehistoric creatures.

The current available Carnivores: Allosaurus, Alioramus, Ceratosaurus, Concavenator, Daspletosaurus, Deinonychus, Kaiwhekea, Latenivenatrix, Megalania, Metriacanthosaurus, Pycnonemosaurus, Sarcosuchus, Spinosaurus, Suchomimus, Thalassodromeus, and Tyrannosaurus.

The current available Herbivores: Albertaceratops, Amargasaurus, Anodontosaurus, Barsboldia, Camptosaurus, Deinocheirus, Eotriceratops, Iguanodon, Kentrosaurus, Lambeosaurus, Pachycephalosaurus, Stegosaurus, Struthiomimus, and Styracosaurus.

The current non-playable fauna: Basilemys, Didelphodon, Goniopholis, Palaeosaniwa, and Platyhystrix.

Development 
Path of Titans was first announced in January 2019. Players that had access to the demo feature could have created sample dinosaurs using available skins and models, as well as observe AI dinosaur interactions, and test out their day/night and weather cycles. Players are encouraged to document and log observed bugs to help aid in development. Those who frequently find and report previously unrecorded bugs can earn in game rewards such as custom skins. As of yet, the release date was still unknown.

There are more dinosaurs planned for upcoming releases, adding to the list of current carnivores and herbivores. There are also plans to release pterosaurs as well as marine reptiles.

Upcoming carnivores: Achillobator and Microraptor.

Upcoming herbivores: Miragaia longicollum.

Upcoming flyers: Rhamphorhynchus, Hatzegopteryx.

Upcoming aquatics: Tylosaurus, Leedsichthys, Eurhinosaurus,.

There are additional game modes in development as well including territory control, capture the egg, deathmatch, last man standing, and dungeon master which will allow you to modify weather, hand out quests, and spawn in creatures for the players in your game.

References

External links
 

Multiplayer video games
Survival video games
Unreal Engine games
Video games developed in Australia
Windows games
Linux games
MacOS games
Dinosaurs in video games